John of Canterbury (died 1204) was Bishop of Poitiers 1162 to 1181 and Archbishop of Lyon 1181 to 1193. He became a "cosmopolitan and much-respected churchman".

He began as a clerk to Theobald of Canterbury. He became Treasurer of York in 1152. At the wish of Henry II of England, he was made Bishop of Poitiers, and consecrated at the Council of Tours in 1163. He was a close supporter of Thomas Becket in his quarrel with Henry II.

While he was elected Archbishop of Narbonne, that election was superseded by his election at Lyon and he did not take up the see. At Lyon, he forbade the preaching of the Waldensians.

He resigned his position at Lyon, to become a monk at Clairvaux, where he lived out his life. He was the addressee in his retirement of an important papal letter, Cum Marthae circa, dated 29 November 1202.

Notes

References

Sources

1204 deaths
Archbishops of Lyon
Bishops of Poitiers
12th-century Roman Catholic archbishops in France
Year of birth unknown